Xenokeryx ("strange horn" in Greek) is an extinct genus of ruminant known from the Miocene of Europe. The type species, Xenokeryx amidalae, was recovered from central Spain and bears a unique T-shaped protrusion from the top of the head. The specific epithet amidalae is in reference to the character Padmé Amidala from the Star Wars films "due to the striking resemblance that the occipital appendage of Xenokeryx bears to one of the hairstyles that the aforementioned character shows in The Phantom Menace feature film."

References

External links

Palaeomerycidae
Miocene even-toed ungulates
Prehistoric even-toed ungulate genera
Miocene mammals of Europe
Fossil taxa described in 2015
Star Wars